Lesmahagow Old Parish Church is a congregation of the Church of Scotland within the Presbytery of Lanark. It is the largest church in the South Lanarkshire town of Lesmahagow.

A Culdee settlement of Celtic monks existed prior to the 12th Century. The church was dedicated in the name of St. Machutus (St. Malo). This dedication was retained when King David I of Scotland granted "the Church and lands of Lesmahagow" to the Tironensian Order of monks who had already established Kelso Abbey at Kelso.

The Priory Church was burnt in 1335 by troops under the command of John of Eltham, brother of King Edward I of England. Many people had sought sanctuary within the church at the time of the burning and are thought to have perished. Thereafter a new church was constructed and lasted until the early 19th century. The present church was constructed in 1804 on the original site. Originally built as a plain, rectangular church, an apse was constructed later in the 19th century and an organ (in the West Gallery) was built by Brindley & Foster and installed in 1889. The Chapter House was added in 1934. After serious damage by fire in 1981 the apse was restored and the entire church redecorated.

The church contains some notable stained glass. The centre panel of the East Window, "The Descent from the Cross" is a copy from the centre panel of the triptych painted by Rubens for an altar in Antwerp Cathedral in 1614.

The previous minister (since 2003 to approx 2011) was the Revd Aileen Robson,Now it is Rev Morag Garret. Recent former ministers were the Revd Sheila Mitchell 1995-2002 (now a hospital chaplain in Ayr), preceded by the Revd William Niven 1969-1994 (who died in December 2004).

Lesmahagow Old Parish Church is linked with neighbouring Coalburn Parish Church (i.e. sharing the same minister).

[View of Church and Cemetery:

[Picture of St. Malo:

Sources: Church of Scotland Yearbook and Churches to Visit in Scotland (2000 edition), published by St Andrew Press, Edinburgh, plus local information.

See also 
List of Church of Scotland parishes

External links 
Coalburn and Lesmahagow Parish Church
Church of Scotland

Church of Scotland churches in Scotland
Churches in South Lanarkshire
Category B listed buildings in South Lanarkshire
Listed churches in Scotland
Lesmahagow